Museum of the Macedonian Struggle may refer to:

Museum of the Macedonian Struggle (Chromio), Kozani regional unit, Greece, commemorating the late 19th to early 20th Century Greek struggle for Hellenic Macedonia.
Museum of the Macedonian Struggle (Kastoria), Greece, dedicated to the late 19th to early 20th Century Greek struggle for Hellenic Macedonia, with emphasis on the period surrounding the events of 1878.
Museum of the Macedonian Struggle (Skopje), North Macedonia, commemorating the 19th century struggle for Macedonian statehood and independence.
Museum for the Macedonian Struggle (Thessaloniki), Greece, commemorating the struggle for Hellenic Macedonia.